The British Rail Class 950 is a diesel multiple unit that was purpose-built by British Rail Engineering Limited's Holgate Road carriage works for the British Rail Research Division for use as a track assessment unit. It is currently operated by Network Rail.

Description

It was built in 1987 using the same bodyshell as the Class 150/1 Sprinters. It was originally classified as a Class 150, but was reclassified into the departmental series. As part of the privatisation of British Rail, it passed to Railtrack in 1994 and then Network Rail in 2002. The unit is formed of two driving motor vehicles, numbered 999600 and 999601.

Current operations
The unit is currently painted in a plain overall yellow livery with Network Rail branding. It mostly works on branch lines, where the track quality is not good enough for larger and heavier track assessment stock. It is able to operate over most railway lines around Great Britain. The unit is based at the Railway Technical Centre in Derby.

Fleet details

References

External links

950
Non-passenger multiple units
Train-related introductions in 1987
Track recording trains
British Rail Departmental Units